HAT-P-50b is an exoplanet orbiting HAT-P-50 star located in the Gemini constellation. It was discovered in 2015.

References

Exoplanets discovered in 2015
Transiting exoplanets
Gemini (constellation)
Exoplanets discovered by HATNet